Pachaiyappa's College is one of the oldest educational institutions in Chennai, in the South Indian state of Tamil Nadu. In addition, it is the first sole Indian college in Madras Presidency.

History

Pachaiyappa's College, Chennai is the result of an act of philanthropy of its progenitor, Pachaiyappa Mudaliar, who was a financier and merchant by the age of 22. Inspired and motivated by the preciousness and large-heartedness of the benevolent founder. This college had its genesis in the famous will of Pachaiyappa Mudaliar.

The college was established as Pachaiyappa's Central Institution at Popham's Broadway on 1 January 1842, from money given in Pachaiyappa Mudaliar's will. It was the first educational institution in South India which was not funded by the British. The architecture of the institution is monumental, consisting of Indo-Saracenic and the architecture of South India. It gained college status in 1889, and until 1947 only admitted Hindu students.

In addition, Pachaiyappa's College (1842) is the 4th oldest institution in the country, next to Madras Christian College (1837) and Presidency College (1840) as 3 from the top 5 oldest institutions in the country are from South India.

Administration 
The Pachaiyappa's College Administration is governed by a board of trustees called Pachaiyappa's trust board. The Board oversees the long-term development and plans of the Institution and manages fundraising efforts. The board also control's various other Institutions in the state.

List of colleges under Pachaiyappa's Trust Board
Chellammal Women's College
C. Kandaswami Naidu College for Men
Kandasamy Naidu College for Women (KNC), Cuddalore.
Pachaiyappa's College for Men, Kanchipuram.
Pachaiyappa's College for Women, Kanchipuram.

Awards
As a remembrance and a devotion, the college awards a prize to the student who stands first among all mathematics students in the name of S.P. Singaravelu Mudaliar, who was a teacher of renowned mathematician Srinivasa Ramanujan.

Academic departments

Undergraduate (U.G.)

SHIFT I: Aided

Arts
B.A. (History)
B.A. (Tamil Lit.)
B.A. (English Lit.)
B.A. (Economics)
B.A. (Philosophy)

Commerce
B.Com. (General)
B.Com. (Corporate)

Science
BSc (Mathematics)
BSc (Physics)
BSc (Chemistry)
BSc (Plant Biology & Plant Biotechnology)
BSc (Advanced Zoology & Biotechnology)

SHIFT II: Self-financed

Commerce
B.Com. (General)
BSc (Computer Science)
Co-education
B.Com. (Bank Management)
B.Com. (Accounting & Finance)
B.B.A.
B.C.A

Postgraduate (P.G.)

SHIFT I : Aided

Arts
M.A. (Tamil Lit.)
M.A. (Economics)
M.A. (English Lit.)
M.A. (History)
M.A. (Philosophy)

Commerce
M.Com. (General)

Science and philosophy
MSc Mathematics
MSc Chemistry
MSc Physics
MSc Botany
MSc Zoology
M.Phil. English
M.Phil. Mathematics
M.Phil. Philosophy
M.Phil. History
M.Phil. Economics
M.Phil. Chemistry
M.Phil. Botany
M.Phil. Zoology
M.Phil. Commerce
M.Phil. Tamil

PhD
PhD Tamil
PhD English
PhD Maths
PhD Philosophy
PhD History
PhD Economics
PhD Physics
PhD Chemistry
PhD Botany
PhD Zoology
PhD Commerce

Notable alumni
A listing of notable alumni is published by the college. Some of those named are as follows.

Physicist
Anna Mani

Mathematicians
Srinivasa Ramanujan (did not graduate), mathematician

Politicians
Kasu Brahmananda Reddy, Chief Minister of Andhra Pradesh, 1964–71
Murasoli Maran, politician
Prof. K. Anbazhagan, politician
Navalar Nedunchezhiyan, politician, Interim Chief minister, Minister for 25 years
E. V. K. Sampath, politician and one of the founders of Dravida Munnetra Kazhagam
C. Vijayaraghavachariar, former President of the Indian National Congress
K. C. Reddy, first Chief Minister of old state of Mysore
Boddepalli Rajagopala Rao, parliamentarian
C. N. Annadurai, Chief Minister of Tamil Nadu, 1967–69
Nanjil .K. Manoharan, Finance Minister during MGR's Government and Revenue Minister during M. Kaunanidhi's Government
E. Pugazhendi, Cuddalore Legislator thrice
Durai Murugan, Kadpadi, Vellore Legislator and Senior Most Cabinet Minister of TN State in the last 4 decades
Chengee Ramachandran, Union Minister and Senior Parliamentarian 
Erode Ganesamurthy, Senior Parliamentarian, thrice as Member of Parliament
 Nellikuppam Krishnamoorthi Senior Parliamentarian 1967, and Senior Legislative assembly member in 1962, 1971 and 1980. Public Accounts Committee Chairman in 1980.

IAS and IPS Officers

P. Natesan, IAS Officer
R. Sekar, IPS Officer
C. K. Gandhirajan, IPS Officer
M. C. Sarangan, IPS Officer

Public Relations
 S.P.Ezhilazhagan, Additional Director (Information) Information and Public Relations Department, Government of Tamilnadu, Officer
Chennai District All college students Tamil Forum President 1979-80
Orator and Debator of Pachaiyappa's college, 1979-1981

Literary figures
Paravastu Chinnayasuri, Telugu poet and professor of Telugu language
Pammal Sambandha Mudaliar, Tamil playwright
Mamidipudi Venkatarangayya, history writer
Vairamuthu, poet
K. D. Thirunavukkarasu, Tamil scholar and Sahitya Akademi Award winner
Tapi Dharma Rao, Telugu journalist and Sahitya Akademi Award winner

Filmmakers
R. S. Manohar, drama and Tamil cinema actor
A. M. Rajah, singer and music director
D. Imman, music director
Na. Muthukumar, Tamil Lyricist

Other 
N. Madhava Rao - Former Diwan of Kingdom of Mysore, Member of Drafting Committee, Mysore Civil Service (ICS Officer)
Robin Singh, former Indian cricketer
Bharath Reddy, former Indian cricketer
S. Yesudhason, former Principal, NMS S. Vellaichamy Nadar College, Madurai
M.Periayasamy, academist, poet
Prof. M. Ilanchezhian, -Tamil Scholar and Writer, Professor, Rationalist
M. B. Nirmal, environmentalist and founder of Exnora International
P. Sambandam, former director of NSDRC, professor of Marine engineering IIT Madras, Alumni IIT Kharagpur

Postage stamp 
On 31 March 2010, the Indian Postal Service released a commemorative postage stamp on Pachaiyappa Mudaliar. The multi colour stamp was designed by India Security Press, Nasik.

References

Educational institutions established in 1842
Arts and Science colleges in Chennai
Colleges affiliated to University of Madras